Agustín García Calderón (born August 14, 1948 in Santa Ana, El Salvador) was the President of the Supreme Court of El Salvador until 2009.

References

Salvadoran judges
1948 births
Living people
People from Santa Ana, El Salvador
University of El Salvador alumni
21st-century Salvadoran people